Y Pant School is an 11–18 mixed, English-medium community comprehensive secondary school and sixth form in Talbot Green, Pontyclun, Rhondda Cynon Taf, Wales.

History 
Since the original school was built, two main buildings have been added: the sports hall and the "new block", built in 2006. The school was nominated as best state school in Wales in 2003 by a leading newspaper.

In October 2011, the school was inspected under the new Estyn framework and was judged to be an 'Excellent' school in terms of its current performance, prospects for improvement, standards, pupil outcomes, teaching and leadership.

The original school building, gym and DT block and boiler house was built in the 1950s, with a science, cookery, languages and art building being built in 1977.

Several portable buildings were added throughout the 1980s - early 2000's.

In recent years, the school has seen a number of new buildings added: the sports hall opened in 1996, the "new block" opened in 2002, the new changing rooms opened in 2006 and In 2016, the £24 million new school building was completed and all the original buildings including the 1950s main building and 1970s language block being demolished, with the new block and the school gym being refurbished.

Notable alumni 
 Caroline Jones, politician
 Mark Wool, Welsh rugby league player

References

External links 
 

Secondary schools in Rhondda Cynon Taf